The 1990 New Orleans Saints season was the franchise’s 24th season in the National Football League, the 15th to host games at the Mercedes-Benz Superdome and the fifth under head coach Jim Mora. The team looked to improve on its 9–7 record from 1989 and make the playoffs for the second time in franchise history. The Saints did not improve on their 9–7 record, as they finished the season 8–8. However, the Saints would unexpectedly make the postseason as the final seed in the NFC after getting a win and the Cowboys losing in the final week of the regular season.

The season 
The Saints, with a record of eight wins and eight losses, became the second team in NFL history at or below .500 to qualify for postseason play, and the first to do so as a wild card. Since no non-playoff team in the NFC had a record at or above .500, the Saints were awarded the final Wild Card seed. In the 1990 postseason, the Saints would lose to the Chicago Bears 16–6.

Others to finish 8–8 and make the playoffs were the 1985 Cleveland Browns, the 1991 New York Jets, the 1999 Detroit Lions, the 2004 St. Louis Rams, the 2004 Minnesota Vikings, the 2008 San Diego Chargers and the 2011 Denver Broncos. However, the 2010 Seahawks would break this record, as they finished the 2010 season at 7–9 and clinched their division, becoming the first team in NFL history to win their division despite having a losing record, and this would be repeated by the 2014 Carolina Panthers. Coincidentally, the Saints during that 2010 season met Seattle in that season’s NFC Wild Card game, in which they were upset 41–36.

Offseason

NFL Draft

Personnel

Staff

Roster

Regular season

Schedule

Standings

Playoffs

References

External links 
 Saints on Pro Football Reference
 Saints on jt-sw.com

New Orleans
New Orleans Saints seasons
New